Erick Manana is an acoustic guitarist, singer and songwriter from Madagascar. He often performs in a duo or as a solo artist, singing in accompaniment to his acoustic guitar in the ba-gasy genre that gained prominence in the central highlands of Madagascar in the 1930s. He began to learn to play guitar and sing in the ba-gasy style from his grandfather at the age of five. In 1979 he left Madagascar to settle in France and currently lives in Bordeaux. His professional career as a musician began in 1982 as a member of Lolo sy ny Tariny. He recorded his first solo album in 1996. He was a member of the group Feo-Gasy alongside the celebrated sodina player Rakoto Frah, and together the group toured Europe several times, promoting the traditional music of the central highlands of Madagascar. He has worked on a variety of collaborative projects, recording singles and performing with established artists such as Regis Gizavo and Solorazaf, and young breakthrough stars like Aina Quash. Most recently, Manana formed a group with valiha player Justin Vali and other prominent Malagasy artists in the Malagasy All Stars. 

In January 2013, Manana performed at the historic Olympia venue in Paris to celebrate the 35th year of his career. At the close of the event, he was awarded the prestigious Commandeur de l'Ordre des Arts et des Lettres ("Commander of Liberal and Fine Arts") medal by the representative of the Republic of Madagascar to UNESCO.

Rootsworld described Manana as the "Bob Dylan of Madagascar". Manana has received several awards, including the 1994 Prix Media Adami Découvertes at the annual Radio France International global musical competition and the Grand Prix du disque de l'académie Charles Cros in 1997 for his album Vakoka.

See also
Music of Madagascar

Notes

20th-century Malagasy male singers
Living people
Malagasy guitarists
Malagasy emigrants to France
Year of birth missing (living people)
21st-century Malagasy male singers